Andrew Newberg is an American neuroscientist who is a professor in the Department of Integrative Medicine and Nutritional Sciences and the director of research at the Marcus Institute of Integrative Health at Thomas Jefferson University Hospital, previously an adjunct professor of religious studies and a lecturer in psychology in the Biological Basis of Behavior Program at the University of Pennsylvania.

He has been a prominent researcher in the field of nuclear medical brain imaging and neurotheology. In particular, his research has focused on the development of neurotransmitter tracers for the evaluation of religiosity as well as neurological and psychiatric disorders including clinical depression, head injury, Alzheimer's disease, and Parkinson's disease.

His 2010 book Principles of Neurotheology gives a basic understanding on the research done so far on neurotheology.

Biography
Newberg graduated from Haverford College in 1988 with a degree in chemistry and then received his medical degree in 1993 from the University of Pennsylvania. He then completed postgraduate training in Internal Medicine with a Residency at the Graduate Hospital from 1993 to 1996, and then did a Fellowship in Nuclear Medicine at the University of Pennsylvania Department of Radiology from 1996 to 1998. He was certified in Internal Medicine by the American Board of Internal Medicine in 1997 and certified in Nuclear Medicine by the American Board of Nuclear Medicine in 1998.

Because of his work in the intersection between religion and the brain, he was an adjunct assistant professor in the Department of Religious Studies at the University of Pennsylvania. From 2005 to 2010 he was also the Director of the Center for Spirituality and the Mind. Newberg also teaches a neuroimaging course in the Biological Basis of Behavior Program.

Academic research
In the early 1990s, he began to research the intersection between the brain and religious and spiritual experiences. In this work, also sometimes referred to as "neurotheology", Newberg described the possible neurophysiological mechanisms associated with religious and spiritual experiences. His initial research included the use of functional brain imaging to study Buddhist meditators and Franciscan nuns in prayer. He has continued to study religious and spiritual phenomena including topics related to forgiveness, meditation, prayer, spiritual development, morality, and belief. This work has been incorporated more recently into a new Center for Spirituality and the Mind at the University of Pennsylvania.

Literary activities
Newberg is the author of ten books (translated into 16 languages), and over 200 articles on neuroimaging in neuropsychiatric disorders and also on neuroscience and religion. His book, Why God Won't Go Away, is a popularized account of this topic which describes some of the brain imaging studies and his theories regarding the nature of religious and spiritual experiences. Why We Believe What We Believe, co-authored with Mark Robert Waldman (Executive MBA Faculty, Loyola Marymount University) describes the relationship between the brain and beliefs and also describes brain imaging studies of an atheist and individuals speaking in tongues (or glossolalia). A more recent book, How Enlightenment Changes Your Brain, also co-authored with Waldman, is a scientific and practical look at how faith and meditation can enhance brain function. Steering away from the topic of faith, his latest book, co-authored with Mark Waldman, Words Can Change Your Brain describes how a research-based communication practice, "compassionate communication", can be used to improve brain health and interpersonal communication. The book and communication strategies are now part of the NeuroLeadership course offered in the EMBA program at Loyola Marymount University. The communication strategies have been documented and published in the Journal of Executive Education.

Media appearances
Newberg's research has been featured in Newsweek, the Los Angeles Times, and the New Scientist.  He has been a guest speaker at the Forum at Grace Cathedral and appeared in the films What the Bleep Do We Know!? and Religulous. He has appeared on Dr. Oz, StarTalk with Neil deGrasse Tyson, Good Morning America, Nightline, 20/20, CNN, ABC World News Tonight, as well as in the movie Awake: The Life of Yogananda. His work has been featured in a number of major media articles including in Time, National Geographic, Discover, New York Times, Popular Mechanics, O Magazine, London Observer, Philadelphia Inquirer, and Reader's Digest.

Reception

Recognition
Newberg was listed as one of the 30 Most Influential Neuroscientists Alive Today by the Online Psychology Degree Guide.

Criticism

From the religious perspective, concerns have been raised that the study of practices such as meditation does not necessarily extrapolate to the broader array of religious and spiritual phenomena. Newberg tends to agree with this concern and has argued that future studies are needed to elucidate the more complex elements of religious and spiritual phenomena. Newberg has maintained that science and brain imaging studies are only tools to evaluate the brain during such experiences but do not necessarily negate such experiences. Newberg has argued that the integration of science and religion is critical for a better understanding of how human beings think and behave in a global context.

Works

References

External links
 AndrewNewberg.com - official site
 

1966 births
American agnostics
American cognitive neuroscientists
Living people
Mysticism scholars
Neurotheology
Psychedelic drug researchers
University of Pennsylvania faculty